Silicon Valley University (SVU) was a private, non-profit higher educational institution located in San Jose, California. The university was accredited by the Accrediting Council for Independent Colleges and Schools (ACICS) at the bachelor's degree and master's degree levels until December 7, 2017. On April 5, 2018, the state regulators of California ordered SVU to close and refund students' money within 45 days. On May 24, 2021, SVU was granted an Approval to Operate for an Institution Non-Accredited by the California Bureau for Private Postsecondary Education (BPPE) by the State of California.

History
Silicon Valley University was founded in 1997 by Feng-Min "Jerry" Shiao (also spelled "Shao") and Mei Hsin "Seiko" Cheng, a married couple from Taiwan. Between 2008 and 2014, it had an average of 300 students; in 2015 it relocated to a larger location in an office park and recruitment expanded. That year enrollment increased to more than 3,600; the university reported 3,983 students in 2016, mostly graduate students in computer science and almost all from foreign countries. In a Brookings Institution study published in 2014, when SVU offered bachelor's, master's, and doctoral studies, it was one of the five institutions in Silicon Valley enrolling the largest numbers of international students. Shiao, who served as chairman and president, subsequently fell out with Cheng, who was chief financial officer, and her younger brother Kevin Cheng, the registrar; the couple divorced in 2017, and the university's board removed Shiao as president. Each side has accused the other of financial irregularities: the Chengs have accused Shiao of understating the university's income and of appropriating funds for personal use, while Shiao has accused Cheng of using university funds to buy real estate through a limited liability company registered in her name, OnPlus, which owns the office building where the university is located.

Following student complaints, ACICS revoked its accreditation of the university on December 7, 2017, for failure to provide audited financial statements. On December 27, 2017, the California Bureau for Private Postsecondary Education filed a fifteen-point complaint against SVU, for alleged violations including improper recruitment of students; hearings are scheduled for June 2018. After the San Francisco Chronicle notified the agency of the revocation of accreditation, the state notified SVU on April 5 that it must immediately cease operations, formulate a closure plan, and give students a list of institutions where they could enroll and refund their money within 45 days.

Academic programs

Graduate programs 
Master of Science in Computer Science (MSCS)

References

External links

Universities and colleges in San Jose
Educational institutions established in 1997
Educational institutions disestablished in 2018
Defunct private universities and colleges in California
1997 establishments in California